Sree Vidyanikethan Degree College was established in 1996 by the actor, educationist, former Member of Parliament and recipient of Padma Shri Dr. M Mohan Babu. Affiliated to Sri Venkateswara University (SVU), Tirupati, A.P. and recognized by Government of Andhra Pradesh, SVDC offers undergraduate courses such as Bachelor of Business Administration (B.B.A), Bachelor of Commerce (B.Com.), Bachelor of Computer Application(B.C.A), and Bachelor of Arts (B.A) in multiple educational stream including fine arts, science, mathematics, physics, biology, electronics, general education, and many more. Accredited by National Assessment and Accreditation Council (NAAC), SVDC also offers post-graduate programmes such as Master of Science (M.Sc.) and Master of Commerce (M.Com.). Admission to Sree Vidyanikethan Degree College  is open and all qualified applicants are admitted through the open admission process.

References

External links

Official website

Colleges in Andhra Pradesh
Universities and colleges in Tirupati
1996 establishments in Andhra Pradesh
Educational institutions established in 1996